John Alexander Harts (September 5, 1873 – August 31, 1947) was a student and elocution teacher at the University of Oklahoma from Winfield, Kansas who served as the first coach of the Oklahoma Sooners football team in 1895.

He was the primary organizer of the first OU team, which was made up of students and Norman, Oklahoma residents. The team only played one game that year against a more experienced Oklahoma City team; the Sooners lost 34–0. Following that year, Harts left OU to prospect for gold in the Arctic.

Harts is the only head football coach of record at Oklahoma to complete his tenure without a win. In the one game that he coached, the Sooners failed to score a point or to make a first down.

Head coaching record

References

External links
John A. Harts at Find a Grave

1873 births
1947 deaths
Oklahoma Sooners football coaches